Giovanni Carandino, also known as Ioannis Karandinos, and sometimes as Jean Carantino or John Carandino, born in 1784 in Cephalonia and died in Napoli in 1834, was a Greek mathematician, founder of the Greek mathematics school and translator in Greek of the major French works on analysis in the early 19th century.

Education 

He studied mathematics during Cephalonia's occupation by the French in 1808, under the direction of Ecole polytechnique's alumnus Charles Dupin, a very good mathematician, who was a navy officer at that time.
Then, under Lord North government on Ionian Islands, his talent was remarked and he was sent to study mathematics in Ecole polytechnique, under Biot, Cauchy, Poisson and Fourier.  Then he went to England for a study trip, and went back to Corfu to establish the Ionian Academy, where he created the first course of modern mathematics in Greek language.

He made contributions to the formalisation of analysis, which were published in 1828 in the Journal des Savants.

He taught an entire generation of Greek mathematicians, and is thus seen as the founder of the modern Greek analysis school.

References

 Recherches sur la nature du calcul différentiel par M. le Dr J. Carandino de Céphalonie, de l'Université Ionienne. 
 AMS Session on History, Washington, DC, on 2009-01-05
 C. Goldstein, J. Gray et J. Ritter (dir.), L'Europe mathématique. Histoires, mythes, identités, Éditions Maison des Sciences de l'Homme, Paris

1784 births
1834 deaths
Greek mathematicians
People from Cephalonia
19th-century Greek scientists
19th-century Greek educators